Michael Eisenring (born 29 March 1993) is a Swiss footballer who plays for FC St. Gallen.

References

Swiss men's footballers
Swiss Super League players
1993 births
Living people
FC St. Gallen players
Association football defenders